"" is a Lutheran hymn written by Valerius Herberger in 1613. The text was published with two hymn tunes by Melchior Teschner, Zahn Nos. 5403 and 5404a, in 1615. The second of these melodies was used in compositions such as chorale preludes by Johann Sebastian Bach and Max Reger. Bach used single stanzas in vocal works, including his St John Passion.

Catherine Winkworth made a metrical translation to "Farewell I Gladly Bid Thee" which also appeared with the second tune as No. 137 in The Chorale Book for England in 1865.

Valet will ich dir geben

Its subtitle reads:The hymn's first word, "Valet", is derived from the Latin  (fare thee well) in the original imprint: Herberger arranged his own Christian name "Valerius" as an acrostic—the first letters of each of the five stanzas form his name, Vale R I V S. The hymn text was first printed in Leipzig in 1614.

Musical settings 
Johann Sebastian Bach used the second of these melodies in his compositions, for instance the chorale preludes BWV 735 and 736. He used the first stanza of the hymn as movement 3 in his cantata Christus, der ist mein Leben, BWV 95, and the third stanza, "" (Within my heart's foundation), in his St John Passion.

Max Reger composed a chorale prelude as No. 38 of his 52 Chorale Preludes, Op. 67 in 1902. Naji Hakim composed in 2011 "Valet will ich dir geben / 5 Variations for Choir and Organ on a Choral by Melchior Teschner". "" is part of the German Protestant hymnal , under number EG 523.

In English 
Winkworth's translation was published as No. 137 in The Chorale Book for England in 1865, with a four-part harmonisation of the tune.

The hymn tune is also known as "St. Theodulph" after Theodulf of Orléans who was the author of the Latin hymn which became, in John Mason Neale's 1845 English translation, "All Glory, Laud and Honour".

References

External links 

17th-century hymns in German
Lutheran hymns
Hymn tunes
1613 works
1610s in music